Wehle is a surname. Notable people with the surname include:

Kim Wehle, law professor and legal analyst
Peter Wehle (1914–1986), Austrian actor, writer, composer, and cabaret performer
Philip C. Wehle (1906–1978), American major general
Shaun Wehle, doctor of clinical psychology 
Susan Wehle (1953–2009), American cantor

German-language surnames